The Pursuit of Happiness is a 1971 American drama film about a student who goes on the run to avoid serving his full prison sentence for vehicular manslaughter. The film was directed by Robert Mulligan. The producer was David Susskind and the associate producer Alan Shayne. The screenplay was written by Jon Boothe and George L. Sherman.

Plot
Disenchanted college student William Popper (Michael Sarrazin) is convicted of vehicular manslaughter for killing a woman with his car. With only a week left on his sentence and the help of his girlfriend, Jane (Barbara Hershey), he escapes to Canada, making both of them wanted fugitives.

Cast
 Michael Sarrazin as William Popper
 Barbara Hershey as Jane Kauffman
 Robert Klein as Melvin Lasher
 Sada Thompson as Ruth Lawrence
 Ralph Waite as Detective Cromie
 Arthur Hill as John Popper
 E.G. Marshall as Daniel Lawrence
 Maya Kenin as Mrs. Conroy
 Rue McClanahan as Mrs. O'Mara
 Peter White as Terence Lawrence
 Joseph Attles as Holmes 
 Beulah Garrick as Josephine
 Ruth White as Mrs. Popper
 Charles Durning as Guard #2
 Barnard Hughes as Judge Vogel
 David Doyle as Senator James J. Moran
 Gilbert Lewis as George Wilson
 Albert Henderson as McArdle
 William Devane as Pilot

See also
 List of American films of 1971

External links
 

1971 films
1971 drama films
American chase films
American drama films
Columbia Pictures films
1970s English-language films
Films scored by Dave Grusin
Films based on American novels
Films directed by Robert Mulligan
Films set in Canada
Films set in New York City
1970s prison drama films
1970s American films